Lieutenant Colonel Syed Mir Ali Imam Al Mamun (born 15 July 1950) is a retired Officer of Bangladesh Army and the head of the aristocratic Padamdi family of Rajbari, present day Bangladesh.

Early life, family and Education
Born to Late Alhajj Syed Shamsul Haque (Retired Civil Servant and formerly Commissioned Officer in the Royal Indian Army) on 15 July 1950, Lieutenant Colonel Syed Ali Imam Al Mamun comes from the renowned Padamdi Nawab Estate, situated at the border of the District of Rajbari (greater Faridpur). 

Commissioned in the Pakistan Army in 1970, Lt. Col. Mamun served under the colors of the 35 Heavy Artillery Regiment in Lahore and also as the Aide-de-Camp for the Corps Commander, IV Punjab Corps.  Back home after enduring the traumas of the legendary Sagai Fort Concentration Camp for more than 2 years, he joined 7 Field Regiment of the Bangladesh Army in 1973.  During his tenure, he commanded troops of the Combined Task Force (comprising the Army, BDR, Police, and the JRB) in Operation Black Panther to recover illegal weapons in the forests of the Sunderbans (Operation Saran khola), and later, counter infiltrations in the Myanmar Borders.

After a short stay in the Army, Lt. Col. Mamun was posted as Aide to the Director General of Bangladesh Rifles.  During his stay in the Peelkhana BDR Headquarters, he worked as instructor of the first contingent of the Rifles Cadre Officers. During the instability that followed the assassination of Bangabandhu Sheikh Mujibur Rahman, Lt. Col. Mamun worked as Aide to Chief of Defense Staff of Bangladesh, and later, with General M A G Osmani, Commander of the Liberation War Forces, and Mr. Shafiul Azam, Cabinet Secretary. During this period, the-then Captain Mamun was instrumental in maintaining legal command over the rebellious military components of the state. Promoted in 1977, Lt. Col. Mamun raised and commanded the 21 Rifle Wing (later, a battalion) in Jessore and served with the 15 Field Regiment Artillery at Kadirabad, Natore.  Lt. Col. Mamun directed the raising of the Sylhet Cadet College during 1979 to 1981, and worked as its first Adjutant.  He commanded military units in Comilla (XIV Field Artillery), Rangpur (with 72 Infantry Brigade), and Jessore (4 Field Regiment Artillery) till 1986.

In 1987, Lt. Col. Mamun took up as the Chief Instructor of Artillery training in the "Artillery Center and School" in Chittagong.  For three years, Lt. Col. Mamun was responsible for the facilitation of the largest Gunners' training programme – commensurate with the largest demobilization of retiring Artillery troops from the Army. Later, Lt. Col. Mamun held the post of Area Admin Commander in the Area Headquarters of Bogra during 1989–90. With the democratic transition, Lt. Col. Mamun assumed the critical command of two BNCC regiments in the Universities of Chittagong and Dhaka during 1991–92.

Posted as the Commanding Officer of 1 Field Regiment Artillery in 1993, Lt. Col. Mamun had the wonderful opportunity of leading one of the finest battle machines of the Bangladesh Army.  Starting with a thoroughly demoralized combat troop – about to be disbanded, Lt. Col. Mamun ultimately led his men to the UN Mission in Haiti in 1995.  1 Field Regiment Artillery was the FIRST ELITE ARTILLERY UNIT, which took part in a United Nations “Peace keeping” Mission, and that too in the operational field orbit of the US Forces' North Atlantic Command.  In the mission to restore peace and democracy in Haiti, Lt. Col. Mamun came in touch with the distinguished leaders of the UN, US, Canada, and the Caribbean isles. He also worked with Mr. Laghdar Brahimi, Special Representative of the UN Secretary General (to Afghanistan and Iraq, amongst others), General Shehan (US North Atlantic Forces' Commander), and Lt. General F W Kenzer.

After the Mission in Haiti, Lt. Col. Mamun joined the Bangladesh Rifles again in 1996.  He worked as the Commanding Officer of 32 Rifle Battalion stationed at Panchari, one of the remotest and deadliest regions of the Chittagong Hill Tracts, and commanded the Counter Insurgency Zone of Logung.  As the Sector Commander of the KHAGRACHARI SECTOR, later on, he worked tirelessly to bring back peace and tranquility in the region. He worked along with the National Committee for Peace with the Parbatya Chattagram Jana Sanhati Samiti (PCJSS), popularly known as the political wing of the Shanti Bahini for its entire length – resulting in the much awaited signing of the Peace treaty.  After the Peace Talks had been through, he was posted to PeelKhana, Dhaka, as the Commanding Officer of 19 Rifle Battalion. Lt. Col. Mamun retired from active duty in the year 2000 as Staff Officer for Military Training in the Army Headquarters. In reserves from the year 2000 to 2003, Lt. Col. Mamun served the Sena Kalyan Sangstha as its Director Secretary and played pivotal roles in negotiating joint venture deals with Motorola, Siemens, different Ministries and authorities of the Government of Bangladesh, and for developing the IT infrastructure of the country.

Stemming from the vision of an enlightened society, Lt. Col. Mamun worked for a brief period as the Vice Principal of Milestone College, Dhaka, during 2003–2004. Since 2004 August, Lt. Col. Mamun worked as the executive director: Kanchan Project of the OPEX Group – one of the largest local conglomerates of the country till mid-2009. He has served the kazi Farms, the Prabashi Kalyan Housing Scheme, and the Patriot Group in a succession afterwards. Currently, he is a Senior Director at the Milestone College.

A graduate from the University of Dhaka, Lt. Col. Mamun had worked with the Students' Union leadership before joining the Army, back in 1969.  He has privileged experience with the civil administration, which include amongst others the Cabinet and the Establishment Divisions, and the Ministries of Home, Education, and Defense.  He is an active proponent of the Leadership Institute Initiative taken up by University of Colorado at Denver. Lt. Col. Mamun has toured and traveled the countryside extensively and lives a colorful life of adventures.  Married, he has been bestowed with two children, Syed Muntasir Mamun and Syeda Zarin Imam.  A commanding officer and operational trainer for more than three decades, Lt. Col. Mamun is serving the country with pride and honor.

Keynotes of Experience

SUCCESSFUL ROLES PLAYED

Corporate Engagement

Major Military Command

Bangladesh Army

Bangladesh Rifles and Home Ministry

Raising and Operating

Staff Positions 
 Aide–De–Camp to Corps Commander: The IV (Punjab) Corps: Pakistan Army, 1970–1971, Lahore
 Aide–De–Camp to Director General: Bangladesh Rifles, 1973–75, Dhaka
 Aide–De–Camp to Chief of Defense Staff: People's Republic of Bangladesh, 1975–76, Dhaka
 Conducting ADC to General M. A. G. Osmani, as the Defense Adviser, 1975–76, Dhaka,
 Conducting ADC to Mr. Ashwini Kumar, Director General, Border Security Forces of India (BSF), 1975, Dhaka

1970–1980
He was posted to the 35 Heavy Artillery Regiment, stationed along the main defence belt for Lahore under the IV Corps commanded by General Bahadur Shah. He was posted as the Aide-de-Camp to the Corps Commander in December 1970. He commanded a heavy artillery battery of the 35 Regiment and took part in the defence of Lahore during the Indo-Pak War of 1971.

After being poisoned in Sagai Fort, Captain Mamun returned to Bangladesh under an agreement mediated by the ICRC between independent Bangladesh and Pakistan in 1973, where he was put in 7 Field Regiment Artillery in stationed in Jessore – supporting 55 Infantry Division. He led a task force of Army, paramilitary Bangladesh Rifles, Police, and the Jatyo Rakshi Bahini in two successful operations against the communist extremists and insurgents under Operation Black Panther (OBP) in the Sarankhola Range of the Sunderbans Forests and in Kushtia. Captain Mamun was deputed to Bangladesh Rifles (BDR) as the Aide-de-Camp of the Major General Quazi Golam Dastgir, and later, Major General Khalilur Rahman.

In the military coup in August 1975, as the ADC to DG-BDR, he commanded a contingent of more than 3,000 troops. During the time of the Soldiers' Mutiny in 1975, led by valiant freedom fighter – turned communist Colonel Abu Taher and A S M Abdur Rab, Captain Mamun was the only officer who put on the rank-badges of an officer – carrying the rank-badges of Major General Ziaur Rahman (later President of Bangladesh) and other senior officers in the breast-pockets of his olive uniform. He was close to Major General Khaled Mosharraf. He served with General M A G Osmani (the Commander-in-Chief of the Mukti Bahini – Freedom Fighters in 1971) later on. In 1976, he was promoted to the rank of a Major and put in the charge of raising 21 Rifle Wing (later, Battalion) in Jessore. In 1978 he took over command of the Romeo Battery of 15 Field Regiment Artillery.

1980–2000
Major Mamun assumed command of 14 Field Regiment Artillery – stationed in Comilla Cantonment in 1981. Major Mamun took over as the Deputy Area and Administrative Quarter Master General (DAA&QMG) of the 72 Infantry Brigade in Rangpur in 1983. Till the end of 1985, Major Mamun also served as the Deputy Chief Martial Law Administrator for eight northern districts of Bangladesh.

In 1986, he was promoted to Lieutenant Colonel and took over command of 4 Mortar Regiment Artillery stationed in Jessore Cantonment under the 55 Div-Support Artillery. It became a Field Artillery Regiment later in 1989. He then became the Chief Instructor of Artillery Training in the Artillery Center – situated in the port city of Chittagong in February 1987. In 1989, he was posted to Bogra with the 11 Infantry Division as the Area and Administrative Quarter Master General (AA&QMG).

After the fall of President Hussain Muhammad Ershad in a mass revolution for democracy in December 1990, he was posted to Bangladesh National Cadet Corps (BNCC) in 1991 as Deputy Director General and Commander – first in Karnaphuli Regiment (stationed in Chittagong University), and then in Ramna Regiment (stationed in Dhaka University).
1 Field Regiment Artillery

Lt. Col. Mamun took over command of 1 Field Regiment Artillery stationed in Jahangirabad Cantonment, Bogra, under the command of 11 Artillery Brigade orbiting 11 Infantry Division on 11 February 1993. He along with the 1 Field Regiment Artillery were stationed to United Nations Stabilisation Mission in Haiti from September 1995. Getting back home, Lt. Col. Mamun was deputed to Bangladesh Rifles (BDR) again and was posted to Paanchari as the Region Commander and Commanding Officer of 32 Rifle Battalion under the Khagrachari Hill District during the signing of the peace treaty. The Peace Treaty was signed and Parbatya Chattagram Jana Sanghati Samiti (PCJSS) leader, Shantu Larma surrendered arms to Prime Minister Sheikh Hasina in February 1998. Lt. Col. Mamun was posted as Commanding Officer of the 19 Rifle Battalion (and for some time as Commander of the Dhaka Sector) the same year. He retired from active service in July 2000.

Awards

Medals and decorations
 Victory Medal 1971
 Constitution Medal 1972
 Distinguished Service Medal – I 1981
 Distinguished Service Medal – II 1991
 Distinguished Service Medal – III 2000
 Dabanol (Wild Fire; 1975) with Gold Bar (1997)
 Bangladesh Rifles – Bicentennial 1995
 United Nations Peace Medal 1996
 Operation Black Panther 1974
 Cyclone Relief Medal 1997
 Parliament Elections Medal 1991

References

External links
 Lt Col Syed Mir Ali Imam Al Mamun at Retired Army Officers Welfare Association.

1950 births
Bangladesh Army colonels
Living people
20th-century Bengalis
21st-century Bengalis
People from Rajbari District
Bangladeshi people of Arab descent